Gere may refer to:
 
 Gere (surname)

Other uses
 Gere, Aragon, Spain
 Gere and Freke, alternative spelling of Geri and Freki in Norse mythology
 Guere language, a Kru language of Ivory Coast

See also
 Gère-Bélesten, a commune in Pyrénées-Atlantiques, France
 GERES (Group for the Environment, Renewable Energy and Solidarity), an international development NGO